Liolaemus espinozai is a species of lizard in the family  Liolaemidae. The species is native to Argentina.

Etymology
The specific name, espinozai, is in honor of American herpetologist Robert Earl Espinoza.

Geographic range
L. espinozai is endemic to Catamarca Province, Argentina.

Habitat

Diet
L. espinozai preys predominately upon ants.

Reproduction
L. espinozai is ovoviviparous.

Taxonomy
L. espinoza belongs to the L. darwinii species group.

References

Further reading
Abdala CS (2005). "Una nueva especie del género Liolaemus perteneciente al complejo darwinii (Iguania: Liolaemidae) de la provincia de Catamarca, Argentina". Revista Española de Herpetología 19: 5–17. (Liolaemus espinozai, new species). (in Spanish).
Ávila LJ, Martinez LE, Morando M (2013). "Checklist of lizards and amphisbaenians of Argentina: an update". Zootaxa 3613 (3): 201–238.
Cabrera, María Paula; Scrocchi-Manfrini, Gustavo José (2020). "Ecología trófica de Liolaemus espinozai Abdala, 2005 (Sauria: Liolaemidae) en Campo El Arenal, Catamarca, Argentina". Cuadernos de Herpetología 34 (1): 17–31. (in Spanish, with an abstract in English).

espinozai
Reptiles described in 2005
Reptiles of Argentina
Taxa named by Cristian Simón Abdala